The 2011–12 Magyar Kupa (English: Hungarian Cup) was the 72nd season of Hungary's annual knock-out cup football competition. It started with the first match of Round 1 on 7 August 2011 and ended with the Final held in May 2012 at Stadium Puskás Ferenc, Budapest. Kecskemét were the defending champions, having won their first cup competition last season. The winner of the competition will qualify for the second qualifying round of the 2012–13 UEFA Europa League.

Qualifying phase

Round 1
Matches were played on 7 August 2011 and involved the teams qualified through the local cup competitions during the previous season and the Nemzeti Bajnokság III teams.

Round of 128
These matches were played between 14 and 17 August 2011 and involved the winners of Round 1 and the 2011–12 Nemzeti Bajnokság II teams.

Round of 64
These matches were played on 21 and 28 September 2011. The winners of Round 2 were joined by the majority of the 2011–12 Nemzeti Bajnokság I teams; sides involved in a European cup competition were given a bye to the next round.

|}

Round of 32
Entering this stage of the competition were the 28 winners from the previous round and the four clubs which competed in Europe this season.

|}

Final stage

Bracket

Round of 16
The sixteen winners of the previous round were drawn into eight two-legged matches. The winners on aggregate advanced to the next round. The first leg will be played on 30 November, the second leg is on 3 December 2011.

|}

Quarter-finals
As in the previous round, ties were played over two legs. The winners advanced to the semi-finals.

|}

First leg

Second leg

Semi-finals
Ties in the semi-finals were also played over two legs.

|}

First leg 
]

Second leg

Final

See also
 2011–12 Nemzeti Bajnokság I
 2011–12 Nemzeti Bajnokság II
 2011–12 Ligakupa

References

External links
 Official site 
 soccerway.com

2011–12 in Hungarian football
2011–12 domestic association football cups
2011–12